Claude Préfontaine (January 24, 1933 - January 5, 2013) was a Canadian actor who also appeared in many films and Canadian versions of cartoons.  He died, aged 79, in Montreal, Quebec, Canada.

Filmography

Movie 
 1966 : YUL 871
 1968 : Valérie
 1970 : Le savoir-faire s'impose
 1972 : The True Nature of Bernadette
 1974 : Les aventures d'une jeune veuve
 1982 : Au boulot Galarneau! (short film)
 1983 : The Deadly Game of Nations
 1984 : Adolescente, sucre d'amour
 1988 : Some Girls
 1989 : Laura Laur
 1991 : Les naufragés du Labrador
 1992 : Communion (short film)
 1995 : La présence des ombres
 2001 : Les oubliés du XXIe siècle ou la fin du travail
 2002 : Savage Messiah

Television 
 Picolo (CBC, 1956)
 Sous le signe du lion (SRC, 1961) — Philippe
 Les Enquêtes Jobidon (SRC, 1962–1964)
 Ti-Jean caribou (SRC, 1963–1966)
 Nos étés (TVA, 2006) — Docteur Pouliot, 1 episode
 Les Sœurs Elliot (TVA, 2007) — Théo Ortéga (contained)

Theater 
 Richard II de Shakespeare
 Dom Juan de Molière
 Au retour des oies blanches (1966)

References

External links 
 Claude Préfontaine (résumé de carrière), sur agencerobitaille.com  
 

1933 births
2013 deaths
Male actors from Montreal
Canadian male film actors
Canadian male television actors